In 1798, there were two special elections for the U.S. Senate from New York:

 January 1798 United States Senate special election in New York
 August 1798 United States Senate special election in New York